Under the Gun is a 1995 Australian action film directed by Matthew George and starring Richard Norton and Kathy Long. The film was released direct to home video in 1995.

Plot
Frank Torrance is a former ice hockey star turned night club owner who wants to sell out and catch the next plane out of town but is heavily in debt.

Cast

Production
The film was independently financed with Imperial Entertainment acquiring all worldwide rights except Australia and North America. It was financed by Tom Kuhn and Fred Weintraub and was mostly shot at a deserted power station next to the Yarra River in Richmond, Melbourne.

References

External links

1995 films
Australian action films
1990s action films
1990s English-language films
1990s Australian films